Climacoceratidae is a family of superficially deer-like artiodactyl ungulates which lived in the Miocene epoch in Africa. They are close to the ancestry of giraffes, with some genera, such as Prolibytherium, originally classified as giraffes.

The climacoceratids, namely members of what is now the type genus Climacoceras, were originally placed within the family Palaeomerycidae, and then within Giraffidae.  In 1978, W. R. Hamilton erected a new family, placing it close to Giraffidae within the superfamily Giraffoidea.

They differ from giraffes in that their antler-like ossicones are derived from different bones.

References
 MacInnes, D. G. 1936, "A new genus of fossil deer from the Miocene of Africa", Journal of the Linnean Society, Zoology 39: 521–530.
 Hamilton, W. R., 1978, "Cervidae and Palaeomerycidae", 495–508, in Maglio, V. J. & Cooke, H. B. S., (eds.) "Evolution of African mammals", Harvard University Press, Cambridge, Massachusetts & London, England, 1978, xiv-641

 
Giraffoidea
Miocene first appearances
Miocene extinctions
Prehistoric mammal families